Aswaraopeta is a mandal in Bhadradri Kothagudem district, Telangana.

Geography

References

Mandals in Bhadradri Kothagudem district